Swartzia bombycina is a species of flowering plant in the family Fabaceae. It is found only in Ecuador. Its natural habitat is subtropical or tropical moist lowland forests.

References

bombycina
Flora of Ecuador
Least concern plants
Taxonomy articles created by Polbot